Azadshahr (also Romanized as Āzādshahr and Āzād Shahr; formerly, Shah Pasand, also Romanized as Shāh Pasand) is a city and capital of Azadshahr County, in Golestan Province, in northern Iran.  At the 2011 census, its population was 39,484 in 10,944 families.

References

Populated places in Azadshahr County

Cities in Golestan Province